Mesosa lata is a species of beetle in the family Cerambycidae. It was described by Stephan von Breuning in 1956. It is known from India.

References

lata
Beetles described in 1956